Blackwell Branch is a  long 2nd order tributary to Lanes Creek in Anson County, North Carolina.

Course
Blackwell Branch is formed at the confluence of Maness Branch and Caudle Branch about 2 miles northwest of Peachland, North Carolina.  Blackwell Branch then flows southeasterly to meet Lanes Creek about 0.5 miles north of Peachland.

Watershed
Blackwell Branch drains  of area, receives about 48.0 in/year of precipitation, has a topographic wetness index of 434.25 and is about 44% forested.

References

Rivers of North Carolina
Rivers of Anson County, North Carolina
Tributaries of the Pee Dee River